Lawi Hydro Power Project is an under-construction Hydro Power Project on Shishi River (a tributary of Chitral River) in Khyber Pakhtunkhwa, Pakistan.

References

Hydroelectric power stations in Pakistan
Run-of-the-river power stations